Asp Lake is a lake in Chisago County, Minnesota, in the United States.

Asp Lake was named for the aspen trees lining the lake shore.

See also
List of lakes in Minnesota

References

Lakes of Minnesota
Lakes of Chisago County, Minnesota